The saying of Jesus concerning his true relatives is found in the Canonical gospels  of Mark and Matthew.

In the Bible
From :
 There came then his brethren and his mother, and, standing
 without, sent unto him, calling him.  
And the multitude sat about him, and they said unto him,
 Behold, thy mother and thy brethren without seek for thee. 
And he answered them, saying, Who is my mother, or my
 brethren?  
And he looked round about on them which sat about him, and
 said, Behold my mother and my brethren!  
For whosoever shall do the will of God, the same is my
 brother, and my sister, and mother. 

From :
 While he yet talked to the people, behold, his mother and
 his brethren stood without, desiring to speak with him.  
Then one said unto him, Behold, thy mother and thy brethren
 stand without, desiring to speak with thee. 
But he answered and said unto him that told him, Who is my
 mother? and who are my brethren?  
And he stretched forth his hand toward his disciples, and
 said, Behold my mother and my brethren!  
For whosoever shall do the will of my Father which is in
 heaven, the same is my brother, and sister, and mother.

Apocryphal version
A re-organized version also appears in the Gospel of Thomas (Patterson-Meyer Translation):
 99 The disciples said to him, "Your brothers and your mother are
 standing outside." He said to them, "Those here who do what my
 Father wants are my brothers and my mother. They are the ones who
 will enter my Father's kingdom." 
 100 They showed Jesus a gold coin and said to him, "The Roman
 emperor's people demand taxes from us." He said to them, "Give the
 emperor what belongs to the emperor, give God what belongs to God,
 and give me what is mine." 
 101 "Whoever does not hate [father] and mother as I do cannot be
 my [disciple], and whoever does [not] love [father and] mother as
 I do cannot be my [disciple]. For my mother [...], but my true
 [mother] gave me life." 

Verse 100 (Caesar's Coin) is similar to Mark 12:13-17 and Luke 20.22-26.

Sayings of Jesus
Gospel episodes